This is the discography of Japanese darkwave duo Aural Vampire.

Albums

Studio albums

Extended plays

Singles

Music videos

Other

Guest Contributions
Blood - Blood (Featuring Exo-Chika)
Mind:State - Close Your Eyes (Aural Vampire Mix)
Boss on Parade - DJ TECHNORCH (Aural Vampire's Blast-O-Matic)
Angelus - Gpkism (Aural Vampire Remix)

Miscellaneous Songs 
Yagi Parade [2004.11.29]
Basara [2007.06.27]
Nosaru (Let It Die OST) [2016.12.03]

External links 
Official Website

Discographies of Japanese artists